The Erlacherhof is a town mansion on the Junkerngasse No. 47 in the Old City of Bern, Switzerland, only a few steps away from the Béatrice-von-Wattenwyl-Haus.

The Erlacherhof is the most representative patrician town mansion in Bern. It is the only Bernese town mansion in the Old City of Bern that has a courtyard. It is not open to the public.

History 

The Erlacherhof was built between 1745 and 1752 after the plans of the Bernese architect Albrecht Stürler for the Bernese patrician Hieronymus von Erlach in place of two older houses of which one was the old town house of the von Erlach family. The other house belonged once to the family of Adrian von Bubenberg. 

In 1748, both the owner and the architect died before the mansion was completed. It was the son of Hieronymus von Erlach, Albrecht Friedrich von Erlach, who gave order to complete the mansion, most probably with the help of the sculptor Johann August Nahl. In honour of his father, Albrecht Friedrich von Erlach decorated the pediments of the east and west wing courtyard façades with the crowned monogram of his father "HvE", Hieronymus von Erlach. 

In 1795, the mansion was bought by the butcher Albrecht Hegi and the merchant David Rudolf Bay. After the decline of the Ancien Régime of Switzerland and the French invasion of Bern, the Erlacherhof became the seat of the French general Guillaume Brune in 1798.

Afterwards, the Erlacherhof was used as a school building before it became the French Embassy in 1831. From 1848 until 1857, the mansion was the first official seat of the Swiss Federal Council. Today, the Erlacherhof and its terraced garden are restored to their former glory. The mansion is now the official seat of the mayor of Bern and his administration.

External links 

 Pictures and further information about the Erlacherhof on the website of the city of Bern
 Pictures and further information about the Erlacherhof on g26.ch

Literature 
 Ueli Bellwald (Hrsg.): Der Erlacherhof in Bern - Baugeschichte, Restaurierung, Rundgang, Bern 1980 

Buildings and structures in Bern
Old City (Bern)
Erlach family